Joseph Emrick is a politician from the U.S. commonwealth of Pennsylvania. A member of the Republican Party, he is a member of the Pennsylvania House of Representatives for the 137th district.

Emrick currently sits on the Consumer Affairs, Local Government, Professional Licensure, and Tourism & Recreational Development committees.

References

External links

State Representative Joe Emrick official caucus site
Joe Emrick (R) official PA House site
Joe Emrick for State Representative official campaign site

Living people
Republican Party members of the Pennsylvania House of Representatives
Kutztown University of Pennsylvania alumni
Lycoming College alumni
21st-century American politicians
Year of birth missing (living people)